Halysidota fuliginosa is a moth of the family Erebidae. It was described by Walter Rothschild in 1909. It is found in Mexico, Guatemala, Honduras, Costa Rica, El Salvador and possibly Peru and Venezuela.

References

Halysidota
Moths described in 1909